The Old Scoundrel (Hungarian:A vén gazember) is a 1932 German-Hungarian drama film directed by Heinz Hille and starring Rosy Barsony, Tibor Halmay and Károly Sugar. It was made as a co-production between the Hunnia Film Studio and German's leading film company UFA. A German-language version And the Plains Are Gleaming was also made by the same director, and featuring several of the same cast members.

The film's sets were designed by the art director Márton Vincze.

Cast
 Rosy Barsony as Mária, Inokay lánya  
 Tibor Halmay as Balassa gróf  
 Károly Sugar as Borly Gáspár  
 Ferenc Táray as Inokay Kornél báró  
 Ilona Cs. Aczél as Inokay felesége  
 Magda Kun as Magda  
 Erzsébet Gyöngyössy as Balassa grófnõ 
 Gusztáv Ilosvay as László, Borly Gáspár unokája  
 Gusztáv Vándory as Thury  
 Emilia Étsy as Perkálné  
 Béla Venczel as Draskóczy tábornok  
 Rezsö Harsányi as Vizsgálóbíró  
 Imre Kovács as Jegyzõ  
 Tivadar Bilicsi as Borügynök  
 Hugó Déri as Másik borügynök

References

Bibliography
 Ferenc Lohr. Hallom a filmet. Magvető, 1989.

External links

1932 films
1930s musical drama films
German musical drama films
Hungarian musical drama films
Films of the Weimar Republic
1930s Hungarian-language films
Films directed by Heinz Hille
Films set in Hungary
UFA GmbH films
Hungarian multilingual films
German black-and-white films
Hungarian black-and-white films
1932 multilingual films
1932 drama films
1930s German films